Marco Bernacci (born 15 December 1983) is an Italian football coach and former player, who currently coaches amateur Promozione club Gambettola. A forward in his playing days, he has played over 200 games in the Italian Serie B.

Playing career

A youth product of hometown club Cesena, Bernacci helped the team through the 2004 Serie C1 playoffs, earning the side promotion to Serie B.

In summer 2006, he joined A.C. Mantova in a joint-ownership bid for €1.7 million. After the arrival of Denis Godeas in January 2007 and Giorgio Corona in July 2007, he was out-favoured by Mantova and was sold to Ascoli, on 31 July 2007, for €1.55 million (€150,000 went to Cesena and €1.4 million to Mantova). Cesena still retained 50% registration rights.

On 15 June 2008, he was sold to Bologna from Ascoli which had won promotion to Serie A. Ascoli bought Cesena's portion for €1.8 million and sold to Bologna for undisclosed fee. He successively spent loan periods back at Ascoli, and a one-month stay at Torino F.C. as part of a loan exchange with Matteo Rubin. On 26 August 2010 it was revealed that Bernacci had unilaterally rescinded his contract due to depression and quit football altogether on a temporary basis. Barnacci later returned to football and was loaned once again by Bologna to Modena for the 2011–12 Serie B season.

He was released in July 2012. On 31 August 2012 he was signed by Bellaria of the fourth division. In July 2013 he moved to Forlì in 2-year contract, another Lega Pro Seconda Divisione club.

On 9 July 2014 the contract was terminated from mutual consent. Bernacci then moved back to Bellaria on 22 July.

Almost a year after Bernacci's return to Bellaria on 1 July 2015, he joined Ribelle for free. This was followed by a number of experiences with amateurs teams of Emilia-Romagna and San Marino.

Coaching career
On 4 March 2022, Bernacci, then a player for Promozione amateurs Gambettola, retired from active football in order to take the head coach role at the same club.

References

External links
 La Gazzetta profile (2007–08)  
 Lega Serie B profile 
 Marco Bernacci at Soccerway

1983 births
Living people
Italian footballers
A.C. Cesena players
Mantova 1911 players
Ascoli Calcio 1898 F.C. players
Bologna F.C. 1909 players
Torino F.C. players
Modena F.C. players
U.S. Livorno 1915 players
A.C. Bellaria Igea Marina players
Forlì F.C. players
A.P.D. Ribelle 1927 players
Serie A players
Serie B players
Serie C players
Serie D players
Association football forwards
Italian football managers
People from Cesena
Footballers from Emilia-Romagna
Sportspeople from the Province of Forlì-Cesena